Federal Route 4 is a federal road in the north of Peninsula Malaysia. The  road connects Butterworth, Penang to Pasir Puteh in Kelantan. The highway also goes close to the border with Thailand and meets Jalan Kompleks CIQ Bukit Bunga at Bukit Bunga.

Route background
The Kilometre Zero is located at Gerik, Perak. At the first kilometre at Gerik, it is connected with the Federal Route 76. At the East–West Highway sections, the highway passing Kuala Rui, Lake Temenggor Bridge (West and East side), Banding Island, Belum Forest Reserve, Air Banun, Lake Pergau and finally at Jeli, Kelantan. The Federal Route 4 then continues from Jeli towards Tanah Merah, Machang and finally at Pasir Puteh, where it meets with the Federal Route 3.

History

Features
At most sections, the Federal Route 4 was built under the JKR R5 road standard, allowing maximum speed limit of up to 90 km/h.

List of junction and towns on the route

References

004

ms:Laluan Persekutuan Malaysia 4